Pier Giulio Delfino (3 April, 1634 – 24 April, 1685) was a Roman Catholic prelate who served as Bishop of Capodistria (1684–1685).

Biography
Pier Giulio Delfino was born in Rovigo, Italy on 3 April 1634. He was ordained a deacon on 25 October 1671 and ordained a priest on 28 October 1671. On 19 June 1684, he was appointed during the papacy of Pope Innocent XI as Bishop of Capodistria. On 24 June 1684, he was consecrated bishop by Alessandro Crescenzi (cardinal), Cardinal-Priest of Santa Prisca. He served as Bishop of Capodistria until his death on 24 April 1685.

References 

17th-century Roman Catholic bishops in the Republic of Venice
Bishops appointed by Pope Innocent XI
1634 births
1685 deaths